Remire Reef is a reef in Seychelles, lying in the Outer Islands of Seychelles, with a distance of 240 km southwest of Victoria, Seychelles.

Geography

Remire Reef dries in patches at low water and extends 4.9 km SSW, with a width of 2.2 km. The reef area is 9.5 km2. There are no islets or cays on the reef. Nearby Remire Island, 2.5 km to the southwest, is clearly detached and separated from Remire Reef by a deep channel.

Administration
The reef belongs to Outer Islands District.

References

External links 

 Island guide 1
 Island guide 2
 National Bureau of Statistics
 Info on the island

Outer Islands (Seychelles)
Reefs